Yzeures-sur-Creuse (literally Yzeures on Creuse) is a commune in the Indre-et-Loire department, central France.

It is one of the oldest towns in Touraine, occupation dating back to the Upper Paleolithic era earlier than 10,000 BCE. Today, it's a village of 1500 inhabitants, situated in a rural setting. The town benefits from the spa activity of the nearby town of La Roche-Posay. Yzeures also offers a range of tourism activities and second homes are numerous.

Its inhabitants are called Yzeurois, Yzeuroises.

Geography

Yzeures-sur-Creuse is located between Tours and Poitiers in the centre of France, on the banks of the river Creuse. The Creuse meets its tributary Gartempe  from Yzeures near the spa town of La Roche-Posay.

It has the distinction of being the only town of Touraine to expand both on the right bank and left bank of the Creuse. It's also the only town in the department to be watered by the Gartempe.

Yzeures sur Creuse lies at the meeting point of the three departments of Indre-et-Loire (37), Indre (36) and Vienne (86).

Neighboring communes
The town has nine surrounding communities. Five are located in the department of Indre-et-Loire (Chambon, Boussay, Preuilly-sur-Claise, Bossay-sur-Claise and Tournon-Saint-Pierre), three in the department of Vienne (Vicq-sur-Gartempe, La Roche-Posay and Lésigny) and one in the department of Indre (Neons-sur-Creuse).

Nearby towns
Tours is  85 km distant, and Poitiers  53 km distant.

Population

Sights

Archaeological structures

Dolmen de la Pierre Levée, near the hamlet of Confluent.

Buildings
The manor house of Granges, dating from the sixteenth century. Has been listed as a monument historique
The château of Harembure, dating from the eighteenth century to the nineteenth century
The château of Pairé or Péré, dating from the sixteenth century
The château of Thou, dating from the sixteenth century. Has been listed as a monument historique
The château of Marigny, dating from the seventeenth century.
The manor house of Gaudru, dating from the fifteenth century.
The château of La Mothe, dating from the nineteenth century.
The church of Notre-Dame, rebuilt in the nineteenth century. This church is built on the site of a Gallo-Roman temple of Minerva.

Museums

 Mado Robin Museum : Museum to the life of this French soprano. (opened in 2009)
You can see pictures, posters and audio-visual materials, and also her stage costumes presented in reconstituted sets of her greatest roles.

 Gallo Roman Museum of Minerva : 80 sculptures limestone blocks and fragmentary sculptures of a Gallo-Roman temple and a column of Minerva. It regularly hosts temporary exhibitions.

Events
 Yzeures'n'Flore. Festival of flowers in April.
 Fête de la Musique
 Ethni'cité Festival on Saturday 11 July 2009.
 Yzeures'n'Rock Free Concert. In 2009, the 4th edition of this event will be held on Saturday 1 August

Personalities
This is a list of people of interest who were born or resided in Yzeures sur Creuse:
Yzeures is the birthplace of Mado Robin (1918–1960) a French coloratura soprano who could hit the octave range of D4 above high-C (D7 in scientific pitch notation or about 2349 Hz).
Agnès Sorel was a mistress of King Charles VII of France. As the story goes, she was born to Fromenteau, a Yzeures's hamlet.
Paul Burty Haviland (17 June 1880 – 21 December 1950) was an early French-American 20th-century photographer. Havilland died at his estate in Yzeures-sur-Creuse, in 1950.

See also
Horned Serpent
Communes of the Indre-et-Loire department
French Wikipedia :fr:Yzeures-sur-Creuse

References

External links

Official site 

Communes of Indre-et-Loire
Indre-et-Loire communes articles needing translation from French Wikipedia